A molly or molly bolt (often misspelled moly) is a type of screw fastener that fastens objects to plaster or gypsum board hollow walls by providing an anchor to be lodged inside a hole and expanded once in position. Larger sizes permit reasonably heavy objects, such as shelving, flatscreen-TV mounts or central-heating radiators, to be attached to drywall in locations where there is no stud behind the drywall. For heavy objects, multiple molly bolts may be required. 

The name Molly was formerly trademarked but is now often used in generic reference. Other names used for this same general type of fastener include hollow-wall anchor and hollow-door anchor, sometimes with design variations but always with the same design theme of expansion via deformation as the screw is tightened. The name drywall anchor sometimes is used in a way that includes both mollies and plastic deformable anchors, and sometimes it is used to contradistinguish the plastic type (wall plugs) from mollies.

History
The molly bolt was patented in 1934 by George Frederick Croessant. Although his patent acknowledges that expandable fasteners of this general kind were already known, Croessant's patent is intended to provide "an improved and adequate anchoring grip that may be retightened if necessary and that will permit repeated withdrawals and reengagements of the associated bolt." The same year, Croessant also registered the trademark "MOLLY".

Attaching

The fastener is an anchor, an expandable sleeve that slides into a hole drilled into the wall. A lip wider than the hole prevents it from falling behind the wall, and often features such as cleats/spikes prevent it from rotating when being compressed. A machine screw is screwed into the sleeve, causing the anchor to bend, expand, spread and grip against the inside of the hole or behind it (in hollow contexts such as drywall over stud cavities, or hollow doors).

Mollies come in various diameters and grip lengths (shank lengths) for different drywall thicknesses and to support different loads.

See also
 Toggle bolt, a bolt that has hinged flaps or wings

References

Home improvement
Wall anchors